Anies may refer to: 

Anieș, a village in the commune Maieru, Bistrița-Năsăud County
Anieș, a river in Bistrița-Năsăud County, Romania
Anies Baswedan, an Indonesian politician

See also

Antes (name)